Magenta is a color.

Magenta may also refer to:

Places
Magenta, Lombardy, Italy
Magenta, Marne, France
Magenta, New South Wales, Australia

Media and entertainment 
Magenta (comics), a DC Comics character, enemy of the Flash
Magenta (EP), a 2020 EP by South Korean singer/songwriter Kang Daniel
Magenta (film), a 1996 film by Gregory Haynes
"Magenta" (The Flash), an episode of The Flash
Magenta (Norwegian band), an alternative rock group
Magenta (Welsh band), a progressive rock group
Magenta, a character in The Rocky Horror Show
Magenta, a character from Blue's Clues
Magenta Telekom, an Austrian subsidiary of T-Mobile

Other uses
Peristrophe bivalvis, also known as the magenta plant
MAGENTA, a block cipher
Magenta (Paris RER) rail station
Magenta Air, a Peruvian airline
A.S. Magenta, a New Caledonian football team
Battle of Magenta, an 1859 during the Second Italian War of Independence

People
Magenta Devine (1957–2019), British TV presenter, journalist and mucosa promoter
Giovanni Magenta (1565–1635), Italian architect
Guy Magenta (1927–1967), French composer
Muriel Magenta, visual artist

See also
 Duke of Magenta (disambiguation)
 Magenta Line (disambiguation)
 Shades of magenta, a list of shades
 
 Magento, an open-source e-commerce platform